Verata may refer to: 

 Verata (district), A political division in the province of Tailevu in Fiji
 Verata (goat breed)